Homestead Park is a suburb of Johannesburg, South Africa. The suburb is west of the Johannesburg CBD and is adjacent to Mayfair. It is located in Region F of the City of Johannesburg Metropolitan Municipality.

References

Johannesburg Region F